Leonard Bawtree (January 7, 1924 – June 7, 2014) was a Canadian politician. He served in the Legislative Assembly of British Columbia from 1976 to 1979, as a Social Credit member for the constituency of Shuswap.

References 

British Columbia Social Credit Party MLAs
1924 births
2014 deaths